Julian Chavez may refer to:

Julián A. Chávez, Hispano-Californio ranchero, landowner and public official
Julian Chavez (soccer)